The 2021 Leipzig Kings season was the inaugural European League of Football season in Leipzig Kings history.

Regular season

Standings

Schedule

Source: europeanleague.football

Despite finishing with an identical 5–5 record as the Cologne Centurions and having scored more points in their two head-to-head games, Leipzig missed out on playoff participation, as the mode for the 2021 season guaranteed playoff spots to the top two teams of each division regardless of record.

Roster

Notes

References 

Leipzig Kings seasons
Leipzig Kings
Leipzig Kings